Mara Schiavocampo, also Mara S. Campo, (born September 28, 1979) is a four-time Emmy Award-winning journalist, podcast host, and Executive Producer. Mara is the host of TV One's investigative show "Fatal Attraction: Last Words". She is also the anchor of Revolt TV's special reports and investigations. Mara frequently appears on cable news as a commentator and analyst, focusing mainly on issues of race and culture.

Mara is one of the highest charting Black podcasters in the country. She was the Executive Producer and Host of the wellness and beauty podcast "The Trend Reporter" (iHeart Media), which twice reached #1 on the iTunes Fashion and Beauty charts. The podcast ran for two seasons. Mara is also the creator, Executive producer, and co-host of the podcast "Run Tell This", which features prominent Black journalists discussing news and current events.

Mara spent 11 years in network television as a Correspondent and Anchor. Mara worked as a Correspondent for "Good Morning America" and ABC News from 2014 to 2018. Before that, she was a Correspondent and Anchor for NBC News. She was an anchor for Early Today on NBC and for First Look on MSNBC and was an NBC News correspondent.

Mara was a pioneer of digital journalism and the first digital correspondent in network news.

Biography
Schiavocampo received her undergraduate degree from University of California, Los Angeles and her master's degree from University of Maryland, College Park.

Schiavocampo has worked for ABC News, CBS News, Current TV, Yahoo!, NPR, Ebony Magazine, The Oprah Winfrey Show, The Dr. Oz Show, and Uptown.
Schiavocampo was with NBC News from 2007 to 2013, where she was a digital correspondent and anchor of Early Today and anchor of MSNBC's First Look for her last three years with NBC.

Schiavocampo is married to Tommie Porter; the couple has two children. The family lives in Harlem, New York.

Schiavocampo is biracial, born of a Sicilian Italian father and an African-American mother.

References

1979 births
Living people
American television journalists
American women television journalists
African-American women journalists
African-American journalists
American writers of Italian descent
African-American television personalities
University of California, Los Angeles alumni
University of Maryland, College Park alumni
21st-century American journalists
People from Silver Spring, Maryland
Journalists from Maryland
21st-century American women
21st-century African-American women
21st-century African-American people
20th-century African-American people
20th-century African-American women